The Battle of La Victoria occurred on 20 and 29 June 1812, in La Victoria, Venezuela. Both Spanish assaults on the city by captain Domingo de Monteverde against the forces of Francisco de Miranda were repulsed by the Venezuelan forces entrenched in the city and Monterverde fell back to San Mateo. In Puerto Cabello, the Spanish prisoners of war held there took control of the San Felipe castle and a slave rebellion near Caracas convinced Miranda that it would do more harm than good to continue the resistance. Miranda entered negotiations with Monteverde and a ceasefire was signed, which Monteverde did not honour several days later, arresting many patriots who had been granted amnesty.

References
 La Independencia (Parte I), VenezuelaTuya —

La Victoria
La Victoria
1812 in Venezuela
1812 in the Viceroyalty of New Granada
June 1812 events